The Superintendency of Corporations is a regulatory agency of the Government of Colombia that oversees corporations

References

See also
 List of company registers

Government agencies established in 1968
Ministry of Commerce, Industry and Tourism (Colombia)
 
Regulators of Colombia